Orion Township may refer to the following places in the United States:

 Orion Township, Fulton County, Illinois
 Orion Township, Michigan (Orion Charter Township)
 Orion Township, Olmsted County, Minnesota

See also

 Orion (disambiguation)

Township name disambiguation pages